Nicotra is a surname. Notable people with the surname include:
Benedetto Nicotra (born 1953), Italian politician, member of the Chamber of Deputies from 2001 to 2006
Benedetto Vincenzo Nicotra (1933–2018), Italian politician, member of the Chamber of Deputies from 1983 to 1994
Giancarlo Nicotra (1944–2013), Italian television actor and director
Tobia Nicotra, prolific Italian forger